Katalin Takács (born 25 June 1942) is a retired Hungarian swimmer who won a bronze medal in the 4 × 100 m freestyle relay at the 1962 European Aquatics Championships. She finished fourth in the same event at the 1964 Summer Olympics.

References

1942 births
Living people
Swimmers at the 1964 Summer Olympics
Olympic swimmers of Hungary
Hungarian female freestyle swimmers
European Aquatics Championships medalists in swimming
Swimmers from Budapest